PalaLottomatica, formerly known as Palazzo dello Sport or PalaEUR, is a multi-purpose sports and entertainment arena in Rome, Italy. It is located in the heart of the well known modern EUR complex. The arena hosted the 1960 Olympic basketball tournaments.

The venue features 8 meetings points, a restaurant for 300 people, and a 2,700 square metre (3,229 sq. yard) outdoor terrace. It has a seating capacity of 11,200 spectators for basketball games. The PalaLottomatica Rome, together with Mediolanum Forum of Milan, is a member of the European Arenas Association (EAA).

History

Palazzo dello Sport was designed by architect Marcello Piacentini, in 1957, and its reinforced concrete dome was engineered by Pier Luigi Nervi. It was constructed in two years, from 1958–1960, in time for the 1960 Summer Olympics. The facility was designed and built along with a smaller facility, the Palazzetto dello Sport, its dome also engineered by Nervi.

Formerly known as PalaSport, and informally known as PalaEUR, from the name of the arena's neighborhood, the "EUR", the arena was renamed to "PalaLottomatica", with the name of Lottomatica coming from the main sponsor that financed the arena's modernization work, from 1999 to 2003.

Modernization of the arena
The arena was renovated between 2000 and 2003. It was made more functional, especially in terms of acoustics, in order to be able to accommodate important musical events. Other changes were made to the original aesthetics of the stadium, particularly the night lighting of its exterior. That was done by adding glazing to the "tabellone della tombola", with numbers dramatically illuminated behind the glass.

The remodeled arena became could seat up to 11,200 spectators. The structure was modified to accommodate multiple sporting events (including internal competitions of, for example, the pro basketball club Pallacanestro Virtus Roma), concerts, conferences, and theatrical events.

Events hosted

The arena hosted the 1960 Olympic basketball tournaments, the EuroBasket 1991 and the 1997 EuroLeague Final Four. It is currently the home arena of the Italian professional basketball team Lottomatica Roma.

In 1997, the PalaLottomatica hosted the EuroLeague Final Four (in the final, Olympiacos defeated Barcelona, by a score of 73–58), and the final stage of the 2005 Men's European Volleyball Championship, hosting the final between Italy and Russia. An audience of over 14,000 spectators was disappointed, due to a 3–2 comeback victory in Italy, after a thrilling game that lasted over two hours. The WWE held a show at the arena on November 7, 2008.

The PalaEUR was also a venue of the 1978 and 2010 FIVB Volleyball Men's World Championships, as well as the 2014 FIVB Volleyball Women's World Championship. The venue was also named the host of the 2016–17 CEV Champions League Final 4 of volleyball, on April 29 and 30, 2017, which followed the prior hosting rights to the 2011 event.

Many artists have performed at the Palazzo dello Sport / PalaLottomatica since the late 1960s and early 1970s: among them, the Rolling Stones in 1970, Depeche Mode several times since 1987, the Cure, Paul McCartney, Iron Maiden, Dire Straits Bon Jovi, and many others.

In 1975, a Lou Reed concert was cancelled because of turmoil between the police and groups of people who were protesting against the high prices of concert tickets; because of that turmoil, the Palazzo dello Sport was seriously damaged, and foreign artists refused to perform in Italy for the next five years, until Bob Marley performed in Milan in 1980. AC/DC performed a show at the arena in May 1996, during their Ballbreaker World Tour. This arena also hosted an Avril Lavigne concert, during her The Black Star Tour, on September 10, 2011. Lana Del Rey has performed twice at the arena, in 2013 during her Paradise Tour and in 2018 during her LA to the Moon Tour. Ariana Grande performed at the arena in 2017 during her Dangerous Woman Tour.

The first artist to perform after the modernization of the arena and its renaming to PalaLottomatica was Santana, in 2003. On 9 December 1989, the final draw for the 1990 FIFA World Cup was held at the Palazzo.

See also
Norfolk Scope
List of indoor arenas in Italy

References

External links

Romeguide.it - PalaLottomatica, Italian website 

Basketball venues in Italy
Indoor arenas in Italy
Massimiliano Fuksas buildings
Pier Luigi Nervi buildings
Modernist architecture in Italy
Olympic basketball venues
Olympic boxing venues
Rome Q. XXXII Europa
Sports venues completed in 1960
Sports venues in Italy
Sports venues in Rome
Venues of the 1960 Summer Olympics
Volleyball venues in Italy